Attia v British Gas Plc [1988] QB 304 is an English tort law case, establishing that nervous shock from witnessing the destruction of personal property may be actionable. Prior to this case, a duty of care for an individual's mental health had not been established in situations not involving personal injury or the witnessing of such an event. The Court of Appeal ruled that British Gas were liable for the subsequent shock and depression of Mrs Attia, following the near total destruction of her home and possessions.

Facts of the Case
British Gas plc were to install central heating in Mrs Attia's home. Whilst installing the system, an employee of British Gas negligently started a fire, which largely destroyed the home and contents within. At first instance, Attia's claim that British Gas had caused her mental shock and distress was denied, with the trial judge holding that damages could only be recovered for psychiatric harm where physical harm to an individual is found.

Judgment of the Case
The Court of Appeal held that Ms Attia could recover damages for psychiatric harm, consequent on the damage to her home. Bingham LJ noted that the decision was breaking new ground, but nevertheless held it was a modest extension to the categories of legitimate claimants.

Significance of the Case
The decision in Attia came before that of Alcock v Chief Constable of South Yorkshire, where close relatives and witnesses of large scale physical harm were barred from recovery for subsequent psychiatric harm. It therefore remains to be seen – though it seems unlikely – whether in light of this decision, this principle would be reaffirmed.

See also 
 English tort law
 Nervous shock (English Law)

Notes of the Case

English tort case law
English psychiatric injury case law
Court of Appeal (England and Wales) cases
1988 in case law
1988 in British Columbia